Rejerrah is a hamlet near Cubert in Cornwall, England. Rejerrah is east of the A3075 main road.

References

Hamlets in Cornwall